Dave Lawson (born David C. Lawson, 25 April 1945 in Alton, Hampshire, England) is an English keyboardist and contemporary composer who in the 1970s was a member of UK progressive rock band Greenslade.

Biography

Early years and Greenslade
During the 1970s Lawson was a member of Greenslade, an English progressive rock band which formed in the autumn of 1972. They made their live debut at Frankfurt's Zoom Club in November 1972, with a line-up of Dave Greenslade (keyboards), Tony Reeves (bass guitar and double bass), Andrew McCulloch (drums and percussion) and Lawson (keyboards and vocals).

The band recorded four studio albums: 
 1973: Greenslade
 1973: Bedside Manners Are Extra
 1974: Spyglass Guest – UK No. 34
 1975: Time and Tide

In the band Lawson largely shared composition with Dave Greenslade, generally writing the lyrics for Greenslade's music, but also contributing music of his own. In contrast to Dave Greenslade's preference for Hammond organ, mellotron and piano, Lawson proved to be a pioneer of analogue synthesizers.

The band announced their disbandment in early 1976, due to management problems, and Lawson then worked as a session musician before touring with Roy Harper and later Stackridge, for which band he appeared on the 1976 album Mr. Mick. In the late 1970's he played mellotron on a BBC live broadcast of David Bedford's Instructions for Angels. He was invited to join the band of Ian Gillan who had recently left Deep Purple but had to decline. He also recorded with Chris Squire and Alan White, who were taking a break from the band Yes, alongside Jimmy Page in a project titled XYZ. Lawson also played with Curved Air and in 1982, whilst recording with Bill Wyman, was invited to play with Foreigner.

Later years
Lawson played on the soundtrack of the film The Man Who Fell to Earth (1976) and later played with John Williams and the LSO for the films Star Wars (1977), Superman (1978) and The Fury (1978). In Star Wars Lawson can be heard playing the ARP 2600 to conjure the sounds of an electric tuba in the famous Tatooine cantina scene. He was a session musician for Peggy Lee, Bing Crosby and Fred Astaire. Lawson has worked as music associate, performer and programmer with such Hollywood film composers such as George Fenton, John Williams and Trevor Jones. He has also composed for a number of successful feature films and television programs.

He has become particularly noted for his work on so-called "fusion scores" such as those for the feature films Angel Heart and Mississippi Burning. He also worked on Steven Spielberg's We're Back! and on Kenneth Branagh's Mary Shelley's Frankenstein, each of which won Golden Reel Awards from the Association of Motion Picture Sound Editors.

In 1988–89, he composed the theme music for the BBC series The Paradise Club, the music for which was later issued as a soundtrack album, with contributions by Stan Tracey Big Band, Carmel and Snake Davis, amongst others.

Lawson has also composed and co-composed, with Ronnie Bond and David Dundas, music for many cinema and television advertisements including those for British Gas, Coco Pops, Philips, Le Coq, Bird's Custard, Braun, Blueband, Britannia, Philip Morris, Accurist, Atari, Dixel, Dulux, Roxy, Mintguard, Bonjour, Ellermans, Wilkinson Sword, Foster Grant, Alpine, Wash'n Dye, Arctic Lite, Yves Saint Laurent.

Current activities
Lawson currently has an extensive sound design studio, with one of the largest privately owned Synclavier and synthesizer systems in Europe.

Discography

Singles
 1973: "Temple Song" / "An English Western" – Greenslade, Warner Bros.: K16264

Albums
 1970: I Spider – Web
 1970: Samurai – Samurai
 1973: Greenslade – Greenslade
 1973: Bedside Manners Are Extra – Greenslade
 1973: Reading Festival 1973 (one track) – Greenslade, GML Records 1008
 1974: Spyglass Guest – Greenslade – UK No. 34
 1975: Time and Tide – Greenslade
 1976: Mr. Mick – Stackridge
 1978: Water Bearer - Sally Oldfield 
 1979: String of Hits - The Shadows 1981: Music Machine – Alan Hawkshaw / Brian Bennett / Dave Lawson 
 1981: Current Affairs – Dave Lawson / John Cameron
 1989: The Paradise Club (six tracks) –  Dave Lawson / Snake Davis and the Charmers / Carmel / Stan Tracey Big Band & others (BBC soundtrack album, REB 764)
 1997: Shades of Green (1972–75) – Greenslade
 1999: BBC on Air – Greenslade: Highland HL380 (promotional only)
 2000: Live (recorded in 1973–75) – Greenslade
 2006: Feathered Friends – Greenslade (box-set compilation)
 2013: Live In Stockholm – March 10, 1975'' – Greenslade

References

External links

Dave Lawson at angelfire.com
Artist's Recordings at davelawson.org

1945 births
Living people
English rock keyboardists
Progressive rock musicians
Musicians from Hampshire
People educated at Charterhouse School
People educated at Tonbridge School
People from Alton, Hampshire
English film score composers
English male film score composers
Greenslade members
XYZ (English band) members
Stackridge members